Maassenia is a genus of moths in the family Sphingidae.

Species
Maassenia distincta Gehlen, 1934
Maassenia heydeni (Saalmüller, 1884)

Macroglossini
Moth genera
Taxa named by Max Saalmüller